Trade Union Pro is a trade union representing banking and clerical workers in Finland.

The union was founded in 2011, when the Trade Union Direct merged with the Union of Salaried Employees.  Like its predecessors, the union affiliated to the Finnish Confederation of Professionals (STTK).

On formation, the union was led by Antti Rinne.  He stood down in 2014, and was succeeded by Jorma Malinen.  In 2019, the Confederation of State Employees' Unions – Pardia merged into Pro, giving it about 120,000 members.  In 2021, the Union of Insurance Employees also merged in.

External links

References

Clerical trade unions
Trade unions established in 2011
Trade unions in Finland